is Japanese-American recording artist Joe Inoue's fourth single, and the first off of his second album Dos Angeles. Inoue worked with producer Mine-Chang on the single, which is described as an electro-pop tune.

Track listing
  – 3:39
 "What Is Your Name?" – 3:52
  – 3:37
  – 3:39

References

External links
 Joe Inoue's official website  

2009 singles
Joe Inoue songs
2009 songs
Ki/oon Music singles